This Island is the second studio album by Australian pop band Eurogliders, released on 7 May 1984 by CBS Records.

The album had a lengthy recording process. Eurogliders changed record labels from PolyGram to CBS in 1983, and recorded the track "No Action" with producer Mark Opitz; it was released as a single in 1983 and peaked at No. 97. The band then replaced bassist Geoff Rosenberg (who had not played on "No Action") with Scott Saunders, and travelled to the UK in July. While there, they replaced Saunders with bassist Ron François, formerly of the Teardrop Explodes and Lene Lovich. With this line-up they recorded the rest of This Island, produced by Nigel Gray (who had also worked with the Police).

By the end of the year, the album recording was complete, but was still not ready for release. Mark Moffatt was brought in to remix six album tracks; meanwhile, the single "Another Day in the Big World" was issued in December 1983. It peaked at No. 66 in Australia.

The album was eventually released in May 1984 and peaked at No. 4 on the Australian Albums Chart. The single, "Heaven (Must Be There)", reached No. 2 on the Australian singles charts, and No. 65 on the US Billboard Hot 100 chart and No. 21 on its Mainstream Rock Tracks chart. The album peaked at No. 140 on the Billboard 200 chart.

Track listing

Personnel
Credits are adapted from the This Island liner notes.

Eurogliders
 Crispin Akerman — guitar
 John Bennetts — drums; percussion; cymbals
 Ron François — synthesiser; bass guitar; backing vocals
 Grace Knight — vocals; tenor saxophone; keyboards
 Bernie Lynch — vocals; synthesiser
 Amanda Vincent — synthesiser; keyboards; glockenspiel

Additional musicians
 Mark Bhan — trumpet
 Mark Isham — trumpet
 Gary Kettel — percussion
 Sam McNally — bass synth on "No Action"
 Mark Moffatt — drums; drum programming
 Giselle Scales — violin

Production and artwork
 Nigel Gray – producer; engineer
 Mark Opitz – producer
 David Nicholas – engineer
 Jim Ebdon – engineer
 Pete Buhlman – engineer
 Mark Moffatt – remixing
 Δ – mastering engineer
 A&L Barnum Graphic Design – cover concept; design

Charts

Certifications

References

External links
 

1984 albums
Eurogliders albums
Albums produced by Nigel Gray
Columbia Records albums